Heinz Wendlinger was a West German bobsledder who competed in the 1950s. He won a silver medal in the four-man event at the 1953 FIBT World Championships in Garmisch-Partenkirchen.

References
Bobsleigh four-man world championship medalists since 1930

German male bobsledders
Possibly living people
Year of birth missing